The CHL Top Draft Prospect Award is given out every year to the top eligible prospect player in the Canadian Hockey League for the annual NHL Entry Draft. The award was first given in 1991, but not awarded from 2003 to 2005. The Quebec Major Junior Hockey League awards the equivalent Michael Bossy Trophy, awarded to the top draft prospect in its league. There is no equivalent award in the Ontario Hockey League or Western Hockey League.

Recipients
List of recipients of the CHL Top Draft Prospect Award.

Players in bold were selected with the first overall selection in the NHL Entry Draft.

See also
 List of Canadian Hockey League awards

References

External links
 CHL Awards – CHL

Canadian Hockey League trophies and awards